Robert Augustus Bayford  (13 March 1838 – 24 August 1922) was an English cricketer and barrister.

Biography
Bayford was born in Albury, Surrey, and educated at Kensington Grammar School and Trinity Hall, Cambridge. He played cricket for eleven different teams at 30 first-class matches from 1857 to 1867, but was mostly involved with Marylebone Cricket Club (MCC). He was a right-handed batsman and occasional wicketkeeper who bowled roundarm slow pace. He scored 822 runs with a highest score of 92 and held seven catches with four stumpings. He took twelve wickets with a best analysis of four for 42.

After Cambridge, Bayford studied law at the Inner Temple. He was called to the Bar in 1863 and became a QC in 1885.

He died at Netley Hill, Botley, Hampshire.

Notes

1838 births
1922 deaths
English cricketers
Alumni of Trinity Hall, Cambridge
Cambridge University cricketers
Cambridge Town Club cricketers
Gentlemen of the North cricketers
Gentlemen of the South cricketers
Marylebone Cricket Club cricketers
Middlesex cricketers
Southgate cricketers
Surrey cricketers
English King's Counsel
Gentlemen of Marylebone Cricket Club cricketers
R. D. Walker's XI cricketers
People from Botley, Hampshire
People from the Borough of Guildford